À l'Olympia (Also called At the Olympia  and Olympia Concert) was Stivell's first live album, recording at L'Olympia. It was released by Fontana in 1972.

Background

Significance 
This live concert was divided into two parts: the first acoustic folk, the second part being electric folk in a style then known as Celtic rock. The evening is a musical tour around the Celtic fringe, from Brittany northwards. 
It was broadcast live on one of the three radio stations in France (seven million listeners live on Radio Europe 1)
Alan Stivell was accompanied by Dan Ar Braz on guitar, Michel Santangelli (the future drummer for Jacques Higelin) on percussion, Gabriel Yacoub, René Werneer, Pascal Stive, Gérard Levasseur, Serj Parayre and Michaël Klec’h.

Stivell à l'Olympia sold a staggering 1,500,000 copies in just over a year (more than 2 million thereafter) and put both Stivell and Breton music on the cultural map once and for all

Context and impact 
1972, the year of its release, was one of radical ferment at home and abroad. The widespread revolt of May 1968 had generated a "back to the earth" movement amongst French students and intelligentsia. The entry of Britain and Ireland into the EEC was seen by radicals in Brittany as the long-awaited opportunity to bring the Celtic nations together and make the ancient dream of Celtic unity a reality. Alan Stivell was closely identified with these trends, even at times hailed as a champion of one or the other cause, but he was himself, as he often later claimed, uneasy about taking on the role of a musical freedom fighter. His deep fascination with cutting edge technology, fuelled by his early love of science fiction put him at odds with any "back to the earth" idealism. Despite the hopes he shared with many of his fellow Breton for a Celtic cultural revival and unity, he always sought to avoid being straight-jacketed by a narrow traditionalist outlook.

The electric ambience of Alan Stivell and his musicians quickly spread like wildfire in France: Stivell had just launched the first "Breton wave". Music from Brittany also became extremely popular and the song Tri Martolod, which is still playing on the radio and in our memories, became the battle flag for an entire generation.

Track listing 

Lyrics and musics are traditionals arranged by Alan Stivell except "The Wind of Keltia" written by Alan Stivell and Steve Waring.

Personnel

Musicians 
 Alan Stivell – lead vocal, Celtic harp, tin whistle (Irish flute), bombard 
 Gabriel Yacoub – guitars, dulcimer, banjo, backing vocals 
 René Werneer – fiddle 
 Pascal Stive – organ 
 Gérard Levasseur – bass 
 Henry Delagarde – cello, flute, bombard 
 Dan Ar Braz – electric guitar 
 Michel Santangeli (29 August 1945–30 September 2014) – drums 
 Serj Parayre – percussions 
 Mikael Klec'h – flute, bombard

Recording 
Producer – Frank Giboni for Fontana Records 
Engineer – Paul Houdebine
Engineer Assistant – Henri Lousteau

Discography 
Source:

Fontana 6399 005 [original French release]
Fontana 6325 321 [France, Italy]
Disques Dreyfus 834-289-2 [French CD release of 1988]

References

Sources 
 Jonathyne Briggs, Sounds French: Globalization, Cultural Communities, and Pop Music in France, 1958–1980, Oxford University Press, 2015, Chapter 4 "Sounds Regional: The World in Breton Folk Music" 

Alan Stivell albums
Celtic rock albums
1972 live albums
Fontana Records live albums
Philips Records live albums
Rounder Records live albums
Albums recorded at the Olympia (Paris)